Oriyo Timbo is an archeological site belonging to Indus Valley civilisation located in Bhavnagar District, Gujarat State, India. The site is measures 4 hectares, located at a distance of 70 km from Rojdi, another Indus Valley site.

Excavation
The excavation at this site was undertaken by Gujarat State Department of Archeology and University Museum of University of Pennsylvania.

Archaeobotanical investigations
Evidence of early agricultural activities were found at this site belonging to Harappan period. Oriyo Timbo has undergone extensive archaeobotanical investigations  and Seetha Narayana Reddy has found significant agricultural practices at this site. Significant find include Millet (ragi)

Findings
An Occupational Stratum containing microlithic tools and ceramics (less in numbers) were found below Lustrous Red Ware occupation(which is important ceramic of Post-Urban Phase of this arae) at this site. Gregory Possehl states that "Oriyo Timbo also produced some radio carbon dates for the micro lithic occupation (Rissman and Chitawala 1990) which indicate that this can be dated to the entire third millennium, possibly extending as far back in time as c.3700 BC." and hunting and gathering people of this area were there at the time when Lothal was occupied.

See also

Pabumath
Babar Kot
Desalpur

References

External links
 Location of Harappan Sites including Oriyo timbo 

Indus Valley civilisation sites
Archaeological sites in Gujarat
Former populated places in India
Bhavnagar district